Coleophora xinjiangensis is a moth of the family Coleophoridae. It is found in China.

The wingspan is 11–14 mm.

References

xinjiangensis
Moths of Asia
Moths described in 1998